The women's tournament of Ice hockey at the 1999 Asian Winter Games at Gangneung, South Korea, was held from 30 January to 4 February 1999.

Squads

Results
All times are Korea Standard Time (UTC+09:00)

Final standing

References 

Results

External links
Rosters

Women